Acria eulectra is a moth in the family Depressariidae. It was described by Edward Meyrick in 1908. It is found in India (Assam).

The wingspan is about 16 mm. The forewings are ochreous-white, with a suffused fuscous patch along the dorsum from the base to two-third, narrowed posteriorly and interrupted in the middle. There is a round patch in the middle of the disc, irregularly mixed with fuscous and blackish. There is also a line of dark fuscous and blackish scales ending in a small spot before the tornus and some slight brownish suffusion beyond this on the lower half, as well as a series of minute dark fuscous dots on the posterior half of the costa and termen. The hindwings are fuscous, thinly scaled and suffused with dark fuscous posteriorly.

References

Moths described in 1908
Acria